La Banquise is a restaurant in Montreal, Quebec, Canada which specializes in the dish of poutine. It serves over thirty different kinds of poutine and is open 24 hours.  Its address is 994 Rue Rachel East in the borough of Le Plateau-Mont-Royal.

History

La Banquise was founded in 1968 by Pierre Barsalou, a firefighter. It was originally an ice cream shop, although it became a snack bar later in the year and served mostly hot dogs and French fries. Poutine was not served at La Banquise until the beginning of the 1980s. Only two types of poutine were served at the beginning, although La Banquise is now known for serving over 30 different varieties. Today the restaurant is owned by Barsalou's daughter Annie and her partner Marc Latendresse.

Reception
On his television program, No Reservations, American chef Anthony Bourdain recommended La Banquise as one of his favourite meals in Montreal.

In the Montreal Mirror's Best of Montreal Readers Poll 2011, La Banquise won the title of Best Late Night Eat in addition to Best Poutine.

Ryan Smolkin developed the Smoke's Poutinerie chain after being inspired by La Banquise. Smolkin frequents La Banquise whenever he visits Montreal.

References

External links
 

1968 establishments in Quebec
Banquise
Montreal cuisine
Restaurants established in 1968
Banquise